Central Square Historic District may refer to:

Central Square Historic District (Cambridge, Massachusetts), listed on the NRHP in Massachusetts
Central Square Historic District (Lynn, Massachusetts), listed on the NRHP in Massachusetts 
Central Square Historic District (Stoneham, Massachusetts), listed on the NRHP in Massachusetts 
Central Square Historic District (Waltham, Massachusetts), listed on the NRHP in Massachusetts
Central Square Historic District (Weymouth, Massachusetts), listed on the NRHP in Massachusetts
Central Square Historic District (Bristol, New Hampshire), listed on the NRHP in New Hampshire

See also
Central Square (disambiguation)